Karlsrud is a station on Lambertseter Line (line 4) of the Oslo Metro, on the north side of Lambertseter. The station is between Brattlikollen and Lambertseter,  from Stortinget. The station was opened on 28 April 1957 as a tramway and 22 May 1966 as a metro. The station's architect was Guttorm Bruskeland.

References

External links

Oslo Metro stations in Oslo
Railway stations opened in 1957
1957 establishments in Norway